Irene Loughlin was born on May 20, 1967 in Hamilton, Canada. Loughlin is known for her performance artwork, writings, and cultural work.

Biography 

Her art embodies real life images of feminism, health activism, to even anti-poverty movements. As Loughlin has practiced her art over the last 15 years, the artworks created have focused more on images to challenge many social constructs such as mental illnesses, visual metaphors of medicine, and ecological landscapes in order to comment on contemporary emotive discourses. The works of art created all stem from images drawn from Loughlin's experiences or witnessed throughout her life such as areas regarding childhood, spiritualism, labour, exercise, depression, diagnosis, sexual abuse, processed foods, rehabilitation, happiness and nourishment, hope, class distinction, sexuality, desire, speech, addiction, therapy, silence, and historical re-enactments.

Loughlin further developed her practice as an artist in Vancouver near the historic Downtown Eastside neighborhood. There she has contributed to the activist and disability community through gallery Gachet, VANDU, and the Carnegie Centre. Loughlin has had the opportunity to display and talk about her artwork in multiple national and international contexts.  Her most recent performance was at The Month Performance Art Berlin at the Enabled Manifesto Project. This was a workshop was culminated in a collective, corporeal manifesto that focused on disabilities and experience theories.

Irene Loughlin currently also works as an instructor in Interdisciplinary Practice, Intermedia and Foundation Studio, at Brock University.

Education 
 University of Toronto, Honors Masters of Visual Studies, Spring 2009 - 2007
Simon Fraser University, Bachelor of Fine Arts, 2005 - 2003
Ontario College of Art, General Studies Diploma AOCA, 1985 - 1989
NSCAD Summer Studio Program NY, Summer 1989

Works 
*These images are all accredited to Irene Loughlin and were retrieved from, Irene Loughlin PDF as cited.*

This image of Irene Loughlin's performance art is called, "light as a feather heavy as lead." This work is to reflect the prosecution of women in the 13th to the 17th century. Specifically focusing in on the practice of identifying and murdering women who were accused of witchcraft in North and European America. There was an oral element to this piece as well. The oral element featured young girls reciting an old lavation spell on loop. The performance was done with the help of artist Victor Vega at Klaus Steinmetz Gallery.

This image of Irene Loughlin's performance art is called, Ayles Ice Shelf." It was done at Htmlles, Studio XX, in Montreal, 2005. It was created as a way to speak about the separation of the Ayles Ice shelf, that separated from the North Pole. This piece embodies the frustration and futility felt by an individual who is facing global warming and its consequences. In this performance, the human body interacts with materials that are associated with separation and migration of the Ayles Ice Shelf.

This image remains untitled and was created in 2012, by Loughlin and curated by Shannon Cochrane. This art performance was to explore mental illnesses in children as well as young adults. The work is to represent the feelings of anxiety, depression, and dissociation. It included actions of resistance and succumbing to social constructs that surround the idea of mental illnesses.

The image to the right was conducted at EPI International Performance center in Chile, 2012. It was created by Irene Loughlin and curated by Alperoa Lota. Here Irene is buried by materials from the earth and work of Lota - coal. It is to resemble the industrial material that is seen with mining and as a way of heating homes. This performance art is dedicated to Isadora Goyencha, as a relation to herself and women in the community of Lota. Irene speaks of this piece as also being a resemblance of her own life living in the industrial steel city of Hamilton.

Awards 
2005 Victor Martyn Lynch-Staunton Award

References

Brunt magazine
Loughlin, Irene, Conversationally Arresting: Ethics, Empathy, and Identification
Fado Performance Inc., Matters of Taste
7a-11d Festival
Canyon, Brice. LIVE; Aspects of Performance Art in Vancouver. Vancouver, Canada: grunt publications, 2000.

External links
Official Site

Living people
1967 births
Canadian performance artists
Women performance artists
Feminist artists
Canadian women artists
NSCAD University alumni